The Malaysian Global Innovation and Creativity Centre or MaGIC is an innovation and creativity centre located at Cyberjaya, Selangor, Malaysia. 

The centre which is under the Ministry of Finance was officially opened on 27 April 2014, by former Malaysian Prime Minister, Najib Tun Razak and his counterpart US President, Barack Obama in conjunction of his visit to the country from 26 to 28 April 2014.

Cheryl Yeoh was appointed as the first and founding CEO of MaGIC on 15 April 2014 and ended her contract on 14 January 2016.

History
In April 2014, Cheryl Yeoh was headhunted by the government of Malaysia and appointed as the first CEO of MaGIC, leaving her career in Silicon Valley. 

MaGIC was given an initial grant of US$21.4 million and was launched by former President Barack Obama and Malaysian's former Prime Minister Najib Razak on 27 April 2014. 

In 2015, MaGIC started out by running accelerator programs for startup companies in Malaysia, led by a team handpicked by Yeoh. The first intake brought in 77 startups, making MaGIC's accelerator program the largest in Southeast Asia.

Yeoh stepped down on 14 January 2016 after her contract period ended. Her CEO position was replaced by Ashran Ghazi shortly after.

In November 2018, Ashran Ghazi announced his resignation to join consumer intelligence firm, Dattel. His position was replaced by former venture capitalist from Cradle Seed Ventures, Dzuleira Abu Bakar, in April 2019.

In September 2020, MaGIC kicked off the fourth cohort of their Global Accelerator Program (GAP) with 40 participating startup teams.

Building
The Obama Oval at the building compound was named after US President Barack Obama.

Employees
Key MaGIC employees have gone on to start startups such as Amazing Fables and GoCar.

References

External links
Malaysian Global Innovation and Creativity Centre (MaGIC) website

Federal ministries, departments and agencies of Malaysia
Ministry of Finance (Malaysia)
Organizations established in 2014
2014 establishments in Malaysia